St Marys is a small township nestled at the junction of the Tasman Highway and the Esk Highway on the East Coast of Tasmania, Australia approximately 10 kilometres (six miles) from the coast.

The town is part of the Break O'Day Council. Its amenities include a craft gallery, bakery, accommodation, shops and supermarkets, and the St Marys Hotel, built in 1916, which dominates the town centre.

Located beneath a rocky outcrop, St Patricks Head (694 metres/2,277 feet), St Marys is a 240 kilometre/149 mile drive north east of Hobart, via Swansea and Bicheno or 130 kilometres/80 miles east of Launceston. It is possible to reach the town from the coast by crossing the mountains via St Marys Pass or Elephant Pass.

History

The first European contact with the district occurred when Captain Tobias Furneaux sighted and named the 694 metre St Patrick's Head in 1773. The early settlement of Van Diemen's Land, which mostly occurred between Hobart and George Town, took little interest in the St Marys area.

It wasn't until the 1840s that a probation station, housing 300 convicts, was built at Grassy Bottom between the town and St Marys Pass. They were assigned to build the road across the mountains to the east coast. This was done between 1843 and 1846.

The arrival of the railway in 1886 led to the town's increasing importance as a service centre. The Elephant Pass route was completed in 1888, which resulted in goods moving across the mountains to the east coast settlements of Bicheno and Chain of Lagoons. In turn this resulted in a small increase in population as the town became a service centre for the surrounding dairy farms.

St. Patrick's Head Post Office opened on 1 June 1835. It was renamed Cullenswood in 1849 and St Marys in 1869.

The railway line which was once so vital to the health of the town is now closed although the railway station still stands.

Geology
Tuff from calc-alkaline volcanoes to the east of Tasmania produced some layers in the upper sediments.

Tourism
St Marys is close to several local attractions, including a trail to the top of St Patricks Head, or the more accessible South Sister Peak, which have forest and coastal views. There are also views from Elephant Pass.

The Coalminers' Heritage Wall and Heritage Walk at the tiny settlement of Cornwall is a monument to the miners who hand-tunnelled a coal mine beneath the Mount Nicholas Range.

Tourists also visit the nearby waterfalls, fish at Lake Leake or go bushwalking in Douglas Apsley National Park.

Christ Church is an unusual little church standing in the middle of fields a few kilometres to the west of St Marys. The church was built in 1847 and was connected with the large property, 'Cullenswood', which was established in the late 1820s by Robert Vincent Legge who arrived in Van Diemen's Land in 1827. The main residence, 'Cullenswood', was built in 1845 and is located on Cornwall Road off the Esk Main Road. It is a two-storey rubblestone Georgian building with a columned verandah and iron-hipped roof. It is not open for inspection.

In December 2006, bushfires ravaged the nearby area.

References

Towns in Tasmania
Localities of Break O'Day Council